Charles Halton (March 16, 1876 – April 16, 1959) was an American character actor who appeared in over 180 films.

Life and career 
Halton trained at the New York Academy of Dramatic Arts. He made his Broadway debut in 1901, after which he appeared in about 35 productions during the next 50 years. From the 1920s, Halton's thinning hair, rimless glasses, stern-looking face and officious manner were also familiar to generations of American moviegoers. Whether playing the neighborhood busybody, a stern government bureaucrat or weaselly attorney, Halton's characters tried to drive the "immoral influences" out of the neighborhood, foreclose on the orphanage, evict the poor widow and her children from their apartment, or any other number of dastardly deeds, all justified usually by "...I'm sorry but that's my job."

Among his highest-profile roles were Mr. Carter, the bank examiner in Frank Capra's It's a Wonderful Life (1946), the Polish theatre producer Dobosh in Ernst Lubitsch's To Be or Not to Be (1942), and a county official from Idaho in Alfred Hitchcock's Mr. & Mrs. Smith (1941). In Enemy of Women (1944), the story of Joseph Goebbels, Halton played against type as a kindly radio performer of children's stories who is arrested by the Nazis.

Although his career slowed down in the 1950s, he also played roles in numerous television series. His 40-year film career ended with High School Confidential (1958), after which he retired.

On April 16, 1959, Halton died of hepatitis in Los Angeles. He was 83.

Selected filmography

The Adventurer (1917) - Austin
God's Man (1917)
Behind the Mask (1917) - Larrabee
The Climbers (1919) - Jordan
The Tower of Jewels (1920) - Jimmy the Rat
Laughter (1930) - Winslow - Gibson's Secretary (uncredited)
Honor Among Lovers (1931) - Wilkes
Storm at Daybreak (1933) - Villager (uncredited)
His Double Life (1933) - Newsman on Phone (uncredited)
Twenty Million Sweethearts (1934) - Sound Effects Man (uncredited)
Come and Get It (1936) - Mr. Hewitt
More Than a Secretary (1936) - Mr. Crosby
Sing Me a Love Song (1936) - Mr. Willard (uncredited)
Gold Diggers of 1937 (1936) - Dr. Bell
Black Legion (1937) - Osgood
Stolen Holiday (1937) - Le Grande
Penrod and Sam (1937) - Mr. Rodney H. Bitts
Ready, Willing and Able (1937) - Brockman
Woman Chases Man (1937) - Mr. Judd
Pick a Star (1937) - Mr. Klawheimer
The Road Back (1937) - Uncle Rudolph
Talent Scout (1937) - M.B. Carter
Dead End (1937) - Whitey (uncredited)
The Prisoner of Zenda (1937) - Passport Officer (uncredited)
Partners in Crime (1937) - Silas Wagon
Trouble at Midnight (1937) - Everett Benson
Blossoms on Broadway (1937) - Dr. Gilgallon
Penitentiary (1938) - Leonard Nettleford (uncredited)
Gold Is Where You Find It (1938) - Turner (uncredited)
Penrod and His Twin Brother (1938) - Mr. Bitts
Bluebeard's Eighth Wife (1938) - Monsieur de la Coste - Store President (uncredited)
Stolen Heaven (1938) - Friedrich Polesie
The Saint in New York (1938) - Vincent Nather
I'll Give a Million (1938) - Mayor
Penrod's Double Trouble (1938) - Mr. Bitts
I Am the Law (1938) - George Leander 
Room Service (1938) - Dr. Glass
The Mad Miss Manton (1938) - Popsy - the Lawyer (uncredited)
A Man to Remember (1938) - Atty. Clyde Perkins (uncredited)
The Girl Downstairs (1938) - Karovian Ambassador (uncredited)
Federal Man-Hunt (1938) - Damon Lauber
Jesse James (1939) - Heywood
Nancy Drew... Reporter (1939) - Newspaper Publicity Man (uncredited)
I'm from Missouri (1939) - Henry Couch
They Made Her a Spy (1939) - Beldon
Sudden Money (1939) - Mr. Wixby
Dodge City (1939) - Surrett's Lawyer
Juarez (1939) - Mr. Roberts (scenes deleted)
 Ex-Champ (1939) - Trilby
They Asked for It (1939) - Dr. Tyler
Young Mr. Lincoln (1939) - Hawthorne (uncredited)
News Is Made at Night (1939) - Lt. Gov. Elmer Hinge
Indianapolis Speedway (1939) - Mayor
Lady of the Tropics (1939) - Manager of Rubber Company (uncredited)
Charlie Chan at Treasure Island (1939) - Redley
Golden Boy (1939) - Newspaperman (scenes deleted)
Dust Be My Destiny (1939) - Pawnshop Owner (uncredited)
No Place to Go (1939) - Mr. Bradford
Reno (1939) - Augustus Welch
The Hunchback of Notre Dame (1939) - Printer (uncredited)
Swanee River (1939) - Pond (uncredited)
The Shop Around the Corner (1940) - Detective
Dr. Ehrlich's Magic Bullet (1940) - Sensenbrenner
The Ghost Comes Home (1940) - Mr. Stark - Steamship Official (uncredited)
Virginia City (1940) - Ralston - Virginia City Banker (uncredited)
Dr. Cyclops (1940) - Dr. Bulfinch
The Man with Nine Lives (1940) - Doctor in Front Row in Final Scene (uncredited)
The Doctor Takes a Wife (1940) - Dr. Streeter
20 Mule Team (1940) - Henry Adams
Lillian Russell (1940) - Dr' Dobbins
Gangs of Chicago (1940) - Bromo
They Drive By Night (1940) - Farnsworth, a loan shark (uncredited)
Lucky Partners (1940) - Chamber of Commerce Official (uncredited)
I Love You Again (1940) - Mr. Leonard Harkspur Sr. (uncredited)
Stranger on the Third Floor (1940) - Albert Meng
Foreign Correspondent (1940) - Bradley
Young People (1940) - Moderator
The Westerner (1940) - Mort Borrow
Calling All Husbands (1940) - Hadley Weaver
Tugboat Annie Sails Again (1940) - Alec Severn
Little Nellie Kelly (1940) - Second Judge (uncredited)
Behind the News (1940) - Neil Saunders
Mr. & Mrs. Smith (1941) - Harry Deever, an Idaho county official
Blonde Inspiration (1941) - Mr. Packer (uncredited)
Meet the Chump (1941) - Dr. Stephanowsky
The Great Mr. Nobody (1941) - Mr. Bixby (uncredited)
Tobacco Road (1941) - Mayor
Footlight Fever (1941) - Mr. E.J. Fingernogle (uncredited)
Mr. District Attorney (1941) - Hazelton - Barrett's Aide
The Lady from Cheyenne (1941) - Judge (uncredited)
Million Dollar Baby (1941) - Parkinson
A Very Young Lady (1941) - Oliver Brixton
Dance Hall (1941) - Mr. Frederick Newmeyer
Three Sons o' Guns (1941) - Haddock
Lady Scarface (1941) - Mr. Pinchback (uncredited)
I Was a Prisoner on Devil's Island (1941) - Commandant
Ellery Queen and the Perfect Crime (1941) - Rufus Smith
The Smiling Ghost (1941) - Great Uncle Ames Bentley
One Foot in Heaven (1941) - Haskins (uncredited)
Three Girls About Town (1941) - Doc - Coroner (uncredited)
Unholy Partners (1941) - Phil Kaper - Attorney
Look Who's Laughing (1941) - Cudahy
H. M. Pulham, Esq. (1941) - Walter Kaufman
The Body Disappears (1941) - Professor Moggs
Captains of the Clouds (1942) - Supintendent Nolan
The Lady is Willing (1942) - Dr. Jones (uncredited)
To Be or Not to Be (1942) - Producer Dobosh
The Adventures of Martin Eden (1942) - Cotton, Publisher of Continental Magazine (uncredited)
Juke Box Jenny (1942) - Judge
Saboteur (1942) - Second Sheriff (uncredited)
The Spoilers (1942) - Jonathan Stuve
Whispering Ghosts (1942) - Attorney Mark Gruber
In Old California (1942) - Mr. Hayes
They All Kissed the Bride (1942) - Doctor (scenes deleted)
Tombstone, the Town Too Tough to Die (1942) - Mayor Dan Crane
There's One Born Every Minute (1942) - Trumbull
Priorities on Parade (1942) - 2nd Examiner
Henry Aldrich, Editor (1942) - Elias Noonan
Across the Pacific (1942) - A.V. Smith
My Sister Eileen (1942) - Mr. Hawkins - Newspaper Editor (uncredited)
You Can't Escape Forever (1942) - Charley Gates (uncredited)
That Other Woman (1942) - AV Smith
Lady Bodyguard (1943) - T. L. Baxter
Jitterbugs (1943) - Samuel L. Cass (uncredited)
My Kingdom for a Cook (1943) - Oliver Bradbury (uncredited)
Flesh and Fantasy (1943) - Mask Shop Proprietor (uncredited)
Government Girl (1943) - Wilkins - Hotel Clerk (uncredited)
Whispering Footsteps (1943) - Harry Hammond
Up in Arms (1944) - Dr. Roger B. Freyheisen
Rationing (1944) - Ezra Weeks
It Happened Tomorrow (1944) - Doctor (uncredited)
Address Unknown (1944) - Censorial Pipsqueak
Wilson (1944) - Colonel House
Shadows in the Night (1944) - Doc Stacey (uncredited)
Enemy of Women (1944) - Uncle Hugo, Radio Performer
The Town Went Wild (1944) - Mr. Tweedle
A Tree Grows in Brooklyn (1945) - Mr. Barker (uncredited)
Rhapsody in Blue (1945) - Mr. Kast
Midnight Manhunt (1945) - Henry Miggs
Mama Loves Papa (1945) - Appleby
She Went to the Races (1945) - Dr. Collyer
The Thin Man Goes Home (1945) - R.T. Tatum (uncredited)
The Fighting Guardsman (1946) - Hyperion Picot (uncredited)
Because of Him (1946) - Mr. Dunlap
Three Little Girls in Blue (1946) - Lawyer Hoskins (uncredited)
Sister Kenny (1946) - Mr. Smith (uncredited)
The Best Years of Our Lives (1946) - Prew
It's a Wonderful Life (1946) - Mr. Carter, bank examiner (uncredited)
Singin' in the Corn (1946) - Obediah Davis
The Ghost Goes Wild (1947) - T. O'Connor Scott
The Bachelor and the Bobby Soxer (1947) - Mr. Mittwick - High School Principal (uncredited)
If You Knew Susie (1948) - Pringle (uncredited)
Summer Holiday (1948) - Mr. Lipska (uncredited)
My Dear Secretary (1948) - Mr. Kilbride (uncredited)
3 Godfathers (1948) - Tolliver Latham
Hideout (1949) - Gabriel Wotter
The Daring Caballero (1949) - Ed J. Hodges
The Sickle or the Cross (1949) - Dr. Short
The Traveling Saleswoman (1950) - Banker Clumhill (uncredited)
The Nevadan (1950) - Red Sand Bank Manager (uncredited)
When Willie Comes Marching Home (1950) - Mr. Fettles (uncredited)
Stella (1950) - Mr. Beeker (uncredited)
Joe Palooka in the Squared Circle (1950) - Merkle - the Shyster
Gasoline Alley (1951) - Pettit
Here Comes the Groom (1951) - Cusick (uncredited)
Three for Bedroom "C" (1952) - Well-Wisher at Station (uncredited)
Carrie (1952) - Factory Foreman
I Love Melvin (1953) - Mr. Prouty, Druggist (uncredited)
A Slight Case of Larceny (1953) - Willard Maibrunn - Magna Gold Oil Co.
The Affairs of Dobie Gillis (1953) - Dean (Grainbelt U.) (uncredited)
The Moonlighter (1953) - Clemmons Usqubaugh - Undertaker
A Star is Born (1954) - Paymaster #1 (uncredited)
Friendly Persuasion (1956) - Brother Cope - Elder (uncredited)
High School Confidential (1958) - W.O. Robinson, High School Principal (uncredited) (final film role)

References

External links

1876 births
1959 deaths
American male silent film actors
American male film actors
American male stage actors
Deaths from hepatitis
Male actors from Washington, D.C.
20th-century American male actors